Będlewo  is a village in the administrative district of Gmina Stęszew, within Poznań County, Greater Poland Voivodeship, in west-central Poland.

It is the location of the Mathematical Research and Conference Center of the Institute of Mathematics of the Polish Academy of Sciences.

References

Villages in Poznań County